A Soviet airspace violation may refer to:

 The hundreds of Nazi prewar incursions into Soviet airspace before Operation Barbarossa
 1960 U-2 incident when a spy plane was shot down over Soviet airspace
 Seaboard World Airlines Flight 253, a 1968 forced landing on Etorofu Island
 Korean Air Lines Flight 902, a 1978 forced landing on a frozen Soviet lake near Finnish border
 Korean Air Lines Flight 007, 1983 shootdown of a Boeing 747 over Sakhalin Island
 Mathias Rust, landing a Cessna 172 in Red Square